Macropoides is a genus of beetles of the scarab beetle family. These species can be found in  Mexico and Central America.

Cladogram

References
Generic Guide to New World Scarab Beetles

Rutelinae